Levent Kartop (born 21 August 1979) is a Turkish football manager and former player who is assistant manager of Denizlispor.

He is a native of Denizli. A midfielder, he played for clubs including Süper Lig sides Denizlispor, Ankaragücü and Konyaspor. After Antalyaspor was promoted to the Süper Lig, he moved to Antalya side.

References

External links
Coach profile at TFF

1979 births
Living people
Turkish footballers
Association football midfielders
Turkey under-21 international footballers
Adana Demirspor footballers
Antalyaspor footballers
MKE Ankaragücü footballers
Denizlispor footballers
Konyaspor footballers
Turgutluspor footballers
Turkish football managers
Turkish expatriate footballers
Turkish expatriate sportspeople in Azerbaijan
Expatriate footballers in Azerbaijan